Dori Dorika ( 1 October 1913 – 1 January 1996) was a Russian-born Italian  actress. She was sometimes credited as Dory Dorika.

Life and career 
Born Dorotea Massa in Odessa, the daughter of a Russian mother and a Neapolitan father, she moved in Milan at very young age, and started her career on stage, in operettas and revues. She got a large popularity in the musical comedy theatre, notably thanks to Un paio d’ali, whose film adaptation marked her debut on the big screen. From then she started an intense film career as a character actress, usually cast in humorous roles.

Filmography

References

External links 
 

Italian film actresses
Italian television actresses
Italian stage actresses
1913 births
1996 deaths
Actresses from Milan
Emigrants from the Russian Empire to Italy
Italian people of Russian descent
20th-century Italian actresses